Charmosynopsis is a genus of parrots in the family Psittaculidae that are endemic to New Guinea, the southern Maluku Islands.

Taxonomy
The genus Charmosynopsis was introduced in 1877 by the Italian zoologist Tommaso Salvadori with the fairy lorikeet as the type species. The genus was formerly considered as a junior synonym of the genus Charmosyna but following the publication of a molecular phylogenetic study in 2020, Charmosynopsis was resurrected for two species in a discrete clade that was a basal to the other members of Charmosyna.

The genus contains two species:
 Blue-fronted lorikeet (Charmosynopsis toxopei)
 Fairy lorikeet (Charmosynopsis pulchella)

References

 
Bird genera
Taxa described in 1859